Gamakia is a genus of South American anyphaenid sac spiders containing the single species, Gamakia hirsuta. It was  first described by M. J. Ramírez in 2003, and has only been found in Chile.

References

Anyphaenidae
Monotypic Araneomorphae genera
Spiders of South America
Endemic fauna of Chile